Devin James Stone is an American lawyer and YouTuber. He is known for his channel, LegalEagle, where he reviews films and television shows to dicuss the level of accuracy of their depictions of the law and courtroom procedure, and to discuss the legal issues raised by those works. He operates a law school exam prep company called Legal Eagle Prep.

Biography 
In 2005, Stone received his B.S. in political science from the University of California, Los Angeles (UCLA). In 2008, he earned his J.D. from the UCLA School of Law. Stone later served a judicial extern for Arthur Lawrence Alarcón, a senior judge for the United States Court of Appeals for the Ninth Circuit, and later worked as an associate at national firms Barnes & Thornburg and Akin Gump Strauss Hauer & Feld LLP.

In February 2020, Stone filed a series of Freedom of Information Act (FOIA) requests asking a federal judge to order the Trump administration to produce the information removed from former national security advisor John Bolton's book, The Room Where It Happened, and to reveal details concerning the underlying prepublication review process. The National Security Council (NSC) Records Access and Information Security Management Directorate (RAISMD) were named as the primary defendants in the action, along with the Central Intelligence Agency (CIA), National Archives and Records Administration, and Departments of Defense, Justice, and State. The suit was dismissed on March 18, 2021.

In September 2021, Stone became an adjunct law professor at Georgetown University.

Accolades

References

External links 
 Legal Eagle Prep
 

Living people
American lawyers
American YouTubers
University of California, Los Angeles alumni
UCLA School of Law alumni
Year of birth missing (living people)